Stephen Arnold Hoxworth (May 1, 1860 – January 25, 1930) was a U.S. Representative from Illinois.

Born in Maquon Township, near Maquon, Illinois, Hoxworth attended the public schools.
He moved to Blue Springs, Nebraska, in 1880.
He engaged in banking and in the grain and implement business.
He served as member of the Nebraska State Militia.
He returned to Illinois in 1885 and engaged in agricultural pursuits near Rapatee, Knox County.
He served as supervisor of Maquon Township 1907–1912.

Hoxworth was elected as a Democrat to the Sixty-third Congress (March 4, 1913 – March 3, 1915).
He was not a candidate for renomination in 1914.
He resumed agricultural pursuits.
He died in Rapatee, Illinois, January 25, 1930.
He was interred in Lyons Cemetery.

References

1860 births
1930 deaths
Democratic Party members of the United States House of Representatives from Illinois